Record World magazine was one of the three main music industry trade magazines in the United States, along with Billboard and Cashbox. It was founded in 1946 under the name Music Vendor, but in 1964 it was changed to Record World, under the ownership of Sid Parnes and Bob Austin. It ceased publication on April 10, 1982. Many music industry personalities, writers, and critics began their careers there in the early 1970s to 1980s.

History

Growth
Record World has been considered the hipper, faster-moving music industry publication, in contrast to the stodgier Billboard and Cashbox, its sister magazine.  Music Vendor, as it was then known, published its first music chart for the week ending October 4, 1954.

A weekly, like its competitors, it was housed in New York City at 1700 Broadway, at 53rd Street, just across the street from the Ed Sullivan Theater, and West Coast editorial offices in Los Angeles on Sunset and Vine.

Rock bands frequented Record World'''s offices as part of their promotional tours, often leaving questionable promo items in their wake. The band Hot Rats, for instance, presented each writer with a freeze-dried and shrink-wrapped rat to remember them by.

Today Record World and its sister magazine Cashbox are at the forefront of today's music industry.

Peak
Record World showed musical diversity by printing a "Non-Rock" survey, comparable to Billboard's "Easy Listening" chart. This chart appeared 2/4/67 and disappeared essentially 5 years later, 3/4/72, having morphed to the name "The MOR Chart" by 1971. Several titles of interest appeared on this 40-position list without making the Billboard Easy Listening survey.Record Worlds peak years coincided with the Studio 54 era, when disco was in full swing. Recording artists tottered through on platform heels, bedecked in rhinestones, often seriously impaired by the then-popular recreational drug cocaine.

Young writers labored far into the night writing reviews of records, analyses of sales data and music-related current events. Staffers included Mike Sigman, editor-in-chief (who then went on to become publisher of the LA Weekly); Howie Levitt, managing editor (later of Billboard and BMI, the music royalty service); Pat Baird, who went on to key publicity positions at both RCA and BMI; Mike Vallone, editor, charts and statistics; associate editor Allen Levy, who went to become a public relations person for United Artists Records, ASCAP and A&M, and who is now a professor of mass communication at Chapman University; art directors Mitchell Kanner, who went on to become Director of Artist Development for Elektra/Asylum Records Records and later Art Director for PolyGram Records, Michael Schanzer, later Stephen Kling and David Ray Skinner; and writers Vince Aletti (later of The New Yorker); Marc Kirkeby (he went on to CBS/Sony Records); Jeffrey Peisch (later of MTV and independent producing); Dave McGee (later of Rolling Stone); Laurie Lennard (later as a talent booker on The Late Show, then wife of comedian Larry David, and producer of Al Gore's An Inconvenient Truth); columnist Sophia Midas; and chart editor and asst. editor Fred Goodman (later editor of Cash Box and current managing editor of Pro Sound News and a songwriter/music publisher); among many others.

Demise
Record World'''s collapse was the result of discord between the two owners, and a sudden downturn in record sales.
However, the new owners and management have revived Record World once again as an online magazine and feature story magazine known as Record World Magazine.

Legacy
In 2012, it was announced that much of the history of Record World (and its predecessor publication, Music Vendor) would be chronicled in a 1954–1982 volume produced by Joel Whitburn's Record Research, long associated with Billboard-related publications. The book was distributed in September 2012. A second volume, featuring the Music Vendor/Record World "Beat Of The Week" charts (similar to Billboards "Bubbling Under"), spotlighting positions 101–150, was announced in November 2012.

In 2013, Bruce Elrod reactivated Record World as a sister publication of Cash Box magazine. The new Record World Magazine has a mandate of promoting the legacy artists while giving coverage to the lesser known and indie artists worldwide. Owners Bruce Elrod and Sandy Graham (Owner and founder of Cashbox Canada (Magazine)) aim to make a difference in the music industry for years to come.

List of number-one singles 
Here is a list of all the songs that reached #1 on the Music Vendor/Record World chart, obtained from the following cited sources.  There were a total of 658 songs that reached #1 on the chart.  In the early history of the chart, multiple versions of the same song charted as one entry, so the most successful recording of these songs is listed.  An asterisk (*) denotes a non-consecutive run at #1.

"The Twist", by Chubby Checker, is the only song to hit #1 in two different chart runs.  The record holder for the most weeks at #1 is Debby Boone's "You Light Up My Life", which stayed on top for 13 weeks.  "I Love Rock 'n Roll", by Joan Jett & The Blackhearts, was the last song to top the chart before the magazine ceased publication.

List of number-one albums

RECORD WORLD #1 POP ALBUMS 
RECORD WORLD #1 POP ALBUMS 1974

01/05 - Singles 1969-1973 / Carpenters (2) 

01/12 - You Don’t Mess Around With Jim / Jim Croce (+) 

01/19 - I Got A Name / Jim Croce 

01/26 - I Got A Name / Jim Croce (2) #2 BB #1 CB 

02/02 - You Don’t Mess Around With Jim / Jim Croce 

02/09 - You Don’t Mess Around With Jim / Jim Croce 

02/16 - You Don’t Mess Around With Jim / Jim Croce (4) 

02/23 - Planet Waves / Bob Dylan 

03/02 - Planet Waves / Bob Dylan (2) 

03/09 - Court And Spark / Joni Mitchell (1) #2 BB #1 CB 

03/16 - The Way We Were / Barbra Streisand (1) 

03/23 - Greatest Hits Volume I / John Denver 

03/30 - Greatest Hits Volume I / John Denver 

04/06 - Greatest Hits Volume I / John Denver (+) 

04/13 - Band On The Run / Paul McCartney & Wings (+) 

04/20 - Greatest Hits Volume I / John Denver (4) 

04/27 - The Sting / Original Soundtrack 

05/04 - The Sting / Original Soundtrack 

05/11 - The Sting / Original Soundtrack 

05/18 - The Sting / Original Soundtrack 

05/25 - The Sting / Original Soundtrack (5) 

06/01 - Band On The Run / Paul McCartney & Wings 

06/08 - Band On The Run / Paul McCartney & Wings (+) 

06/15 - Sundown / Gordon Lightfoot 

06/22 - Sundown / Gordon Lightfoot (2) 

06/29 - Band On The Run / Paul McCartney & Wings 

07/06 - Band On The Run / Paul McCartney & Wings (5) 

07/13 - Caribou / Elton John (+) 

07/20 - Back Home Again / John Denver (+) 

07/27 - Caribou / Elton John 

08/03 - Caribou / Elton John (3) 

08/10 - Back Home Again / John Denver (+) 

08/17 - 461 Ocean Boulevard / Eric Clapton 

08/24 - 461 Ocean Boulevard / Eric Clapton (2) 

08/31 - Fulfillingness’ First Finale / Stevie Wonder 

09/07 - Fulfillingness’ First Finale / Stevie Wonder (2) 

09/14 - Back Home Again / John Denver 

09/21 - Back Home Again / John Denver (4) 

09/28 - Endless Summer / Beach Boys (1) 

10/05 - Bad Company / Bad Company (1) 

10/12 - If You Love Me (Let Me Know) / Olivia Newton-John (1) 

10/19 - Not Fragile - Bachman-Turner Overdrive (1) 

10/26 - Can’t Get Enough / Barry White (1) 

11/02 - Photographs And Memories / Jim Croce 

11/09 - Photographs And Memories / Jim Croce (2) #2 BB #3 CB 

11/16 - Walls And Bridges / John Lennon (1) 

11/23 - Cheech & Chong’s Wedding Album / Cheech & Chong (1) #5 BB #2 CB 

11/30 - Wrap Around Joy / Carole King (1) 

12/07 - It’s Only Rock ‘N’ Roll / Rolling Stones (1) 

12/14 - Greatest Hits / Elton John 

12/21 - Greatest Hits / Elton John 

12/28 - Greatest Hits / Elton John 

RECORD WORLD #1 POP ALBUMS 1975 

01/04 - Greatest Hits / Elton John 

01/11 - Greatest Hits / Elton John 

01/18 - Greatest Hits / Elton John 

01/25 - Greatest Hits / Elton John (+) 

02/01 - Fire / Ohio Players (1) 

02/08 - Greatest Hits / Elton John (8) 

02/15 - Heart Like A Wheel / Linda Ronstadt (1) 

02/22 - Blood On The Tracks / Bob Dylan 

03/01 - Blood On The Tracks / Bob Dylan 

03/08 - Blood On The Tracks / Bob Dylan (3) 

03/15 - Have You Never Been Mellow / Olivia Newton-John (+) 

03/22 - Physical Graffiti / Led Zeppelin 

03/29 - Physical Graffiti / Led Zeppelin 

04/05 - Physical Graffiti / Led Zeppelin 

04/12 - Physical Graffiti / Led Zeppelin (4) 

04/19 - Have You Never Been Mellow / Olivia Newton-John (2) 

04/26 - Chicago VIII / Chicago 

05/03 - Chicago VIII / Chicago (2) 

05/10 - That’s The Way Of The World / Earth, Wind & Fire 

05/17 - That’s The Way Of The World / Earth, Wind & Fire 

05/24 - That’s The Way Of The World / Earth, Wind & Fire 

05/31 - That’s The Way Of The World / Earth, Wind & Fire (4) 

06/07 - Captain Fantastic & The Brown Dirt Cowboy / Elton John 

06/14 - Captain Fantastic & The Brown Dirt Cowboy / Elton John 

06/21 - Captain Fantastic & The Brown Dirt Cowboy / Elton John 

06/28 - Captain Fantastic & The Brown Dirt Cowboy / Elton John 

07/05 - Captain Fantastic & The Brown Dirt Cowboy / Elton John (+) 

07/12 - Venus And Mars / Paul McCartney & Wings (1) 

07/19 - One Of These Nights / Eagles 

07/26 - One Of These Nights / Eagles (+) 

08/02 - The Heat Is On / Isley Brothers 

08/09 - The Heat Is On / Isley Brothers (+) 

08/16 - One Of These Nights / Eagles (+) 

08/23 - The Heat Is On / Isley Brothers (3) 

08/30 - One Of These Nights / Eagles (4) 

09/06 - Captain Fantastic & The Brown Dirt Cowboy / Elton John (+) 

09/13 - Red Octopus / Jefferson Starship (1) 

09/20 - Captain Fantastic & The Brown Dirt Cowboy / Elton John (7) 

09/27 - Born To Run / Bruce Springsteen (1) #3 BB 

10/04 - Wish You Were Here / Pink Floyd (1) 

10/11 - Windsong / John Denver 

10/18 - Windsong / John Denver 

10/25 - Windsong / John Denver 

11/01 - Windsong / John Denver 

11/08 - Windsong / John Denver (5) 

11/15 - Rock Of The Westies / Elton John 

11/22 - Rock Of The Westies / Elton John 

11/29 - Rock Of The Westies / Elton John (3) 

12/06 - Chicago IX Greatest Hits / Chicago 

12/13 - Chicago IX Greatest Hits / Chicago 

12/20 - Chicago IX Greatest Hits / Chicago 

12/27 - Chicago IX Greatest Hits / Chicago (4 >) 

RECORD WORLD #1 POP ALBUMS 1976 

01/03 - Chicago IX Greatest Hits / Chicago 

01/10 - Chicago IX Greatest Hits / Chicago 

01/17 - Chicago IX Greatest Hits / Chicago 

01/24 - Chicago IX Greatest Hits / Chicago (8) 

01/31 - Gratitude / Earth, Wind & Fire (1) 

02/07 - Desire / Bob Dylan 

02/14 - Desire / Bob Dylan 

02/21 - Desire / Bob Dylan 

02/28 - Desire / Bob Dylan (4) 

03/06 - Frampton Comes Alive / Peter Frampton (+) 

03/13 - Their Greatest Hits 1971-1975 / Eagles 

03/20 - Their Greatest Hits 1971-1975 / Eagles 

03/27 - Their Greatest Hits 1971-1975 / Eagles 

04/03 - Their Greatest Hits 1971-1975 / Eagles 

04/10 - Their Greatest Hits 1971-1975 / Eagles 

04/17 - Their Greatest Hits 1971-1975 / Eagles (6) 

04/24 - Presence / Led Zeppelin 

05/01 - Presence / Led Zeppelin 

05/08 - Presence / Led Zeppelin 

05/15 - Presence / Led Zeppelin 

05/22 - Presence / Led Zeppelin (5) 

05/29 - Black And Blue / Rolling Stones (1) 

06/05 - Frampton Comes Alive / Peter Frampton 

06/12 - Frampton Comes Alive / Peter Frampton (+) 

06/19 - Wings At The Speed Of Sound / Paul McCartney & Wings 

06/26 - Wings At The Speed Of Sound / Paul McCartney & Wings 

07/03 - Wings At The Speed Of Sound / Paul McCartney & Wings (3) 

07/10 - Fleetwood Mac / Fleetwood Mac (1) 

07/17 - Frampton Comes Alive / Peter Frampton 

07/24 - Frampton Comes Alive / Peter Frampton 

07/31 - Frampton Comes Alive / Peter Frampton 

08/07 - Frampton Comes Alive / Peter Frampton 

08/14 - Frampton Comes Alive / Peter Frampton 

08/21 - Frampton Comes Alive / Peter Frampton 

08/28 - Frampton Comes Alive / Peter Frampton 

09/04 - Frampton Comes Alive / Peter Frampton 

09/11 - Frampton Comes Alive / Peter Frampton 

09/18 - Frampton Comes Alive / Peter Frampton 

09/25 - Frampton Comes Alive / Peter Frampton 

10/02 - Frampton Comes Alive / Peter Frampton 

10/09 - Frampton Comes Alive / Peter Frampton 

10/16 - Frampton Comes Alive / Peter Frampton (17) 

10/23 - Songs In The Key Of Life / Stevie Wonder 

10/30 - Songs In The Key Of Life / Stevie Wonder 

11/06 - Songs In The Key Of Life / Stevie Wonder 

11/13 - Songs In The Key Of Life / Stevie Wonder 

11/20 - Songs In The Key Of Life / Stevie Wonder 

11/27 - Songs In The Key Of Life / Stevie Wonder 

12/04 - Songs In The Key Of Life / Stevie Wonder 

12/11 - Songs In The Key Of Life / Stevie Wonder 

12/18 - Songs In The Key Of Life / Stevie Wonder 

12/25 - Songs In The Key Of Life / Stevie Wonder (10 >) 

RECORD WORLD #1 POP ALBUMS 1977 

01/01 - Songs In The Key Of Life / Stevie Wonder (11) 

01/08 - Hotel California / Eagles 

01/15 - Hotel California / Eagles 

01/22 - Hotel California / Eagles 

01/29 - Hotel California / Eagles (+) 

02/05 - A Star Is Born / Barbra Streisand - O.S.T. 

02/12 - A Star Is Born / Barbra Streisand - O.S.T. 

02/19 - A Star Is Born / Barbra Streisand - O.S.T. 

02/26 - A Star Is Born / Barbra Streisand - O.S.T. 

03/05 - A Star Is Born / Barbra Streisand - O.S.T. 

03/12 - A Star Is Born / Barbra Streisand - O.S.T. 

03/19 - A Star Is Born / Barbra Streisand - O.S.T. (7) 

03/26 - Rumours / Fleetwood Mac 

04/02 - Rumours / Fleetwood Mac (+) 

04/09 - Hotel California / Eagles 

04/16 - Hotel California / Eagles 

04/23 - Hotel California / Eagles 

04/30 - Hotel California / Eagles 

05/07 - Hotel California / Eagles 

05/14 - Hotel California / Eagles 

05/21 - Hotel California / Eagles (11) 

05/28 - Rumours / Fleetwood Mac 

06/04 - Rumours / Fleetwood Mac 

06/11 - Rumours / Fleetwood Mac 

06/18 - Rumours / Fleetwood Mac 

06/25 - Rumours / Fleetwood Mac 

07/02 - Barry Manilow Live / Barry Manilow (1) 

07/09 - Rumours / Fleetwood Mac 

07/16 - Rumours / Fleetwood Mac 

07/23 - Rumours / Fleetwood Mac 

07/30 - Rumours / Fleetwood Mac 

08/06 - Rumours / Fleetwood Mac 

08/13 - Rumours / Fleetwood Mac 

08/20 - Rumours / Fleetwood Mac 

08/27 - Rumours / Fleetwood Mac 

09/03 - Rumours / Fleetwood Mac 

09/10 - Rumours / Fleetwood Mac 

09/17 - Rumours / Fleetwood Mac 

09/24 - Rumours / Fleetwood Mac 

10/01 - Rumours / Fleetwood Mac 

10/08 - Rumours / Fleetwood Mac 

10/15 - Rumours / Fleetwood Mac 

10/22 - Rumours / Fleetwood Mac 

10/29 - Rumours / Fleetwood Mac 

11/05 - Rumours / Fleetwood Mac 

11/12 - Rumours / Fleetwood Mac 

11/19 - Rumours / Fleetwood Mac 

11/26 - Rumours / Fleetwood Mac 

12/03 - Rumours / Fleetwood Mac 

12/10 - Rumours / Fleetwood Mac 

12/17 - Rumours / Fleetwood Mac 

12/24 - Rumours / Fleetwood Mac 

12/31 - Rumours / Fleetwood Mac (33 >) 

RECORD WORLD #1 POP ALBUMS 1978 

01/07 - Rumours / Fleetwood Mac (F) 

01/14 - Rumours / Fleetwood Mac (35) 

01/21 - Saturday Night Fever / O.S.T. 

01/28 - Saturday Night Fever / O.S.T. 

02/04 - Saturday Night Fever / O.S.T. 

02/11 - Saturday Night Fever / O.S.T. 

02/18 - Saturday Night Fever / O.S.T. 

02/25 - Saturday Night Fever / O.S.T. 

03/04 - Saturday Night Fever / O.S.T. 

03/11 - Saturday Night Fever / O.S.T. 

03/18 - Saturday Night Fever / O.S.T. 

03/25 - Saturday Night Fever / O.S.T. 

04/01 - Saturday Night Fever / O.S.T. 

04/08 - Saturday Night Fever / O.S.T. 

04/15 - Saturday Night Fever / O.S.T. 

04/22 - Saturday Night Fever / O.S.T. 

04/29 - Saturday Night Fever / O.S.T. 

05/06 - Saturday Night Fever / O.S.T. 

05/13 - Saturday Night Fever / O.S.T. 

05/20 - Saturday Night Fever / O.S.T. 

05/27 - Saturday Night Fever / O.S.T. 

06/03 - Saturday Night Fever / O.S.T. 

06/10 - Saturday Night Fever / O.S.T. 

06/17 - Saturday Night Fever / O.S.T. 

06/24 - Saturday Night Fever / O.S.T. 

07/01 - Saturday Night Fever / O.S.T. 

07/08 - Saturday Night Fever / O.S.T. (25) 

07/15 - Some Girls / Rolling Stones (1) 

07/22 - Grease / O.S.T. 

07/29 - Grease / O.S.T. 

08/05 - Grease / O.S.T. 

08/12 - Grease / O.S.T. 

08/19 - Grease / O.S.T. 

08/26 - Grease / O.S.T. 

09/02 - Grease / O.S.T. 

09/09 - Grease / O.S.T. 

09/16 - Grease / O.S.T. 

09/23 - Grease / O.S.T. 

09/30 - Grease / O.S.T. 

10/07 - Grease / O.S.T. 

10/14 - Grease / O.S.T. 

10/21 - Grease / O.S.T. 

10/28 - Grease / O.S.T. 

11/04 - Grease / O.S.T. (16) 

11/11 - 52nd Street / Billy Joel 

11/18 - 52nd Street / Billy Joel 

11/25 - 52nd Street / Billy Joel 

12/02 - 52nd Street / Billy Joel 

12/09 - 52nd Street / Billy Joel 

12/16 - 52nd Street / Billy Joel (6 >) 

12/23 - Greatest Hits Volume II / Barbra Streisand 

12/30 - Greatest Hits Volume II / Barbra Streisand (2 >) 

RECORD WORLD #1 POP ALBUMS 1979 

01/06 - Greatest Hits Volume II / Barbra Streisand (+) 

01/13 - 52nd Street / Billy Joel 

01/20 - 52nd street / Billy Joel (8) 

01/27 - Greatest Hits Volume II / Barbra Streisand (4) 

02/03 - Blondes Have More Fun / Rod Stewart 

02/10 - Blondes Have More Fun / Rod Stewart 

02/17 - Blondes Have More Fun / Rod Stewart (3) 

02/24 - Spirits Having Flown / Bee Gees 

03/03 - Spirits Having Flown / Bee Gees 

03/10 - Spirits Having Flown / Bee Gees 

03/17 - Spirits Having Flown / Bee Gees 

03/24 - Spirits Having Flown / Bee Gees 

03/31 - Spirits Having Flown / Bee Gees 

04/07 - Spirits Having Flown / Bee Gees 

04/14 - Spirits Having Flown / Bee Gees (+) 

04/21 - Minute By Minute / Doobie Brothers (1) 

04/28 - Spirits Having Flown / Bee Gees 

05/05 - Spirits Having Flown / Bee Gees (10) 

05/12 - Breakfast In America / Supertramp 

05/19 - Breakfast In America / Supertramp 

05/26 - Breakfast In America / Supertramp 

06/02 - Breakfast In America / Supertramp 

06/09 - Breakfast In America / Supertramp (+) 

06/16 - Bad Girls / Donna Summer (+) 

06/23 - Breakfast In America / Supertramp 

06/30 - Breakfast In America / Supertramp 

07/07 - Breakfast In America / Supertramp 

07/14 - Breakfast In America / Supertramp (9) 

07/21 - Bad Girls / Donna Summer 

07/28 - Bad Girls / Donna Summer 

08/04 - Bad Girls / Donna Summer (4) 

08/11 - Get The Knack / The Knack 

08/18 - Get The Knack / The Knack 

08/25 - Get The Knack / The Knack 

09/01 - Get The Knack / The Knack (4) 

09/08 - In Through The Out Door / Led Zeppelin 

09/15 - In Through The Out Door / Led Zeppelin 

09/22 - In Through The Out Door / Led Zeppelin 

09/29 - In Through The Out Door / Led Zeppelin 

10/06 - In Through The Out Door / Led Zeppelin 

10/13 - In Through The Out Door / Led Zeppelin 

10/20 - In Through The Out Door / Led Zeppelin (7) 

10/27 - The Long Run / Eagles 

11/03 - The Long Run / Eagles 

11/10 - The Long Run / Eagles 

11/17 - The Long Run / Eagles 

11/24 - The Long Run / Eagles 

12/01 - The Long Run / Eagles 

12/08 - The Long Run / Eagles 

12/15 - The Long Run / Eagles 

12/22 - On The Radio: Greatest Hits Volumes I & II / Donna Summer (1) 

12/29 - The Long Run / Eagles

RECORD WORLD #1 POP ALBUMS 1980 

01/05/80 - The Long Run / The Eagles (F) 

01/12/80 - The Long Run / The Eagles (F) 

01/19/80 - The Long Run / The Eagles 

01/26/80 - The Long Run / The Eagles 

02/02/80 - The Long Run / The Eagles (14) 

02/09/80 - The Wall / Pink Floyd 

02/16/80 - The Wall / Pink Floyd 

02/23/80 - The Wall / Pink Floyd 

03/01/80 - The Wall / Pink Floyd 

03/08/80 - The Wall / Pink Floyd 

03/15/80 - The Wall / Pink Floyd 

03/22/80 - The Wall / Pink Floyd 

03/29/80 - The Wall / Pink Floyd 

04/05/80 - The Wall / Pink Floyd 

04/12/80 - The Wall / Pink Floyd 

04/19/80 - The Wall / Pink Floyd 

04/26/80 - The Wall / Pink Floyd 

05/03/80 - The Wall / Pink Floyd 

05/10/80 - The Wall / Pink Floyd (14) 

05/17/80 - Against The Wind / Bob Seger & The Silver Bullet Band 

05/24/80 - Against The Wind / Bob Seger & The Silver Bullet Band (2) 

05/31/80 - Glass Houses / Billy Joel 

06/07/80 - Glass Houses / Billy Joel 

06/14/80 - Glass Houses / Billy Joel 

06/21/80 - Glass Houses / Billy Joel 

06/28/80 - Glass Houses / Billy Joel 

07/05/80 - Glass Houses / Billy Joel 

07/12/80 - Glass Houses / Billy Joel 

07/19/80 - Glass Houses / Billy Joel 

07/26/80 - Glass Houses / Billy Joel 

08/02/80 - Glass Houses / Billy Joel (+) 

08/09/80 - Emotional Rescue / Rolling Stones (1) 

08/16/80 - Urban Cowboy / Original Soundtrack 

08/23/80 - Urban Cowboy / Original Soundtrack 

08/30/80 - Urban Cowboy / Original Soundtrack 

09/06/80 - Urban Cowboy / Original Soundtrack (+) 

09/13/80 - Glass Houses / Billy Joel (11) 

09/20/80 - Urban Cowboy / Original Soundtrack (5) #3 BB 

09/27/80 - Xanadu / Original Soundtrack (1) #4 BB 

10/04/80 - The Game / Queen 

10/11/80 - The Game / Queen (2) 

10/18/80 - Guilty / Barbra Streisand 

10/25/80 - Guilty / Barbra Streisand 

11/01/80 - Guilty / Barbra Streisand (3) 

11/08/80 - Kenny Roger's Greatest Hits / Kenny Rogers 

11/15/80 - Kenny Roger's Greatest Hits / Kenny Rogers 

11/22/80 - Kenny Roger's Greatest Hits / Kenny Rogers 

11/29/80 - Kenny Roger's Greatest Hits / Kenny Rogers 

12/06/80 - Kenny Roger's Greatest Hits / Kenny Rogers 

12/13/80 - Kenny Roger's Greatest Hits / Kenny Rogers 

12/20/80 - Kenny Roger's Greatest Hits / Kenny Rogers 

12/27/80 - Kenny Roger's Greatest Hits / Kenny Rogers (8 >) 

RECORD WORLD #1 POP ALBUMS 1981 

01/03/81 - Kenny Roger's Greatest Hits / Kenny Rogers (F) 

01/10/81 - Kenny Roger's Greatest Hits / Kenny Rogers (F) 

01/17/81 - Kenny Roger's Greatest Hits / Kenny Rogers 

01/24/81 - Kenny Roger's Greatest Hits / Kenny Rogers 

01/31/81 - Kenny Roger's Greatest Hits / Kenny Rogers 

02/07/81 - Kenny Roger's Greatest Hits / Kenny Rogers (14) 

02/14/81 - Double Fantasy / John Lennon/Yoko Ono 

02/21/81 - Double Fantasy / John Lennon/Yoko Ono (2) 

02/28/81 - Hi Infidelity / R.E.O. Speedwagon 

03/07/81 - Hi Infidelity / R.E.O. Speedwagon 

03/14/81 - Hi Infidelity / R.E.O. Speedwagon 

03/21/81 - Hi Infidelity / R.E.O. Speedwagon 

03/28/81 - Hi Infidelity / R.E.O. Speedwagon 

04/04/81 - Hi Infidelity / R.E.O. Speedwagon 

04/11/81 - Hi Infidelity / R.E.O. Speedwagon 

04/18/81 - Hi Infidelity / R.E.O. Speedwagon 

04/25/81 - Hi Infidelity / R.E.O. Speedwagon 

05/02/81 - Hi Infidelity / R.E.O. Speedwagon 

05/09/81 - Hi Infidelity / R.E.O. Speedwagon 

05/16/81 - Hi Infidelity / R.E.O. Speedwagon 

05/23/81 - Hi Infidelity / R.E.O. Speedwagon 

05/30/81 - Hi Infidelity / R.E.O. Speedwagon 

06/06/81 - Hi Infidelity / R.E.O. Speedwagon 

06/13/81 - Hi Infidelity / R.E.O. Speedwagon 

06/20/81 - Hi Infidelity / R.E.O. Speedwagon 

06/27/81 - Hi Infidelity / R.E.O. Speedwagon 

07/04/81 - Hi Infidelity / R.E.O. Speedwagon (+) 

07/11/81 - Mistaken Identity / Kim Carnes (1) 

07/18/81 - Hi Infidelity / R.E.O. Speedwagon (+) 

07/25/81 - Long Distance Voyager / Moody Blues (1) 

08/01/81 - Hi Infidelity / R.E.O. Speedwagon (21) 

08/08/81 - Prescious Time / Pat Benatar 

08/15/81 - Prescious Time / Pat Benatar (2) 

08/22/81 - 4 / Foreigner 

08/29/81 - 4 / Foreigner (+) 

09/05/81 - Escape / Journey 

09/12/81 - Escape / Journey 

09/19/81 - Escape / Journey (+) 

09/26/81 - Tattoo You / Rolling Stone 

10/03/81 - Tattoo You / Rolling Stone 

10/10/81 - Tattoo You / Rolling Stone (+) 

10/17/81 - Escape / Journey (+) > 

10/24/81 - Tattoo You / Rolling Stone 

10/31/81 - Tattoo You / Rolling Stone (5) 

11/07/81 - 4 / Foreigner 

11/14/81 - 4 / Foreigner 

11/21/81 - 4 / Foreigner 

11/28/81 - 4 / Foreigner 

12/05/81 - 4 / Foreigner 

12/12/81 - 4 / Foreigner 

12/19/81 - 4 / Foreigner 

12/26/81 - 4 / Foreigner (10) >  

RECORD WORLD #1 POP ALBUMS 1982 

1/02/82 - 4 / Foreigner (F) 

1/09/82 - 4 / Foreigner (F) 

1/16/82 - 4 / Foreigner 

1/23/82 - 4 / Foreigner 

1/30/82 - 4 / Foreigner (15) 

2/06/82 - Escape / Journey 

2/13/82 - Escape / Journey (6) 

2/20/82 - Freeze Frame / J. Geils Band (+) 

2/27/82 - Hooked On Classics / Louis Clark Conducts Royal Philharmonica Orchestra #4 BB 3/06/82 - Freeze Frame / J. Geils Band 

3/13/82 - Freeze Frame / J. Geils Band 

3/20/82 - Freeze Frame / J. Geils Band 

3/27/82 - Freeze Frame / J. Geils Band (5) (Unpublished Issue) 

4/03/82 - Beauty and the Beat - The Go-Go's 

4/10/82 - Beauty and the Beat - The Go-Go's (2)

See also
List of Record World number-one albums of 1968

References

External links
Archive of issues of Record World from americanradiohistory.com.

Music magazines published in the United States
Defunct magazines published in the United States
Magazines established in 1946
Magazines disestablished in 1982
Record charts
Entertainment trade magazines
Magazines published in New York City